Joe Frisco (born Louis Wilson Joseph; November 4, 1889 – February 18, 1958) was an American vaudeville performer who first made his name on stage as a jazz dancer, but later incorporated his stuttering voice to his act and became a popular comedian.

Life and career
He was born Louis Wilson Joseph in Milan, Illinois on November 4, 1889. In the mid and late 1910s, he performed with some of the first jazz bands in Chicago and New York City, including Tom Brown's Band from Dixieland, the Original Dixieland Jass Band, and the Louisiana Five.  He made his Broadway debut in the Ziegfeld Follies in 1918. Frisco was a mainstay on the vaudeville circuit in the 1920s and 1930s. His popular jazz dance act, called by some the "Jewish Charleston", was a choreographed series of shuffles, camel walks and turns. It was usually performed to Darktown Strutters' Ball. It, or at least a minute or so of it, can be seen in the film Atlantic City (1944). He typically wore a derby hat, and had a king-sized cigar in his mouth as he danced. He often performed in front of a backing danceline of beautiful women wearing leotards, short jackets and bowler hats—and "puffing" on big prop cigars.

Joe Frisco died of cancer on February 18, 1958, at the Motion Picture Country House and Hospital in Woodland Hills, Los Angeles, California.

Filmography

In popular culture 

 Frisco was so well known for his jazz dance that writer F. Scott Fitzgerald makes reference to him in his 1925 novel The Great Gatsby when he describes how an actress at one of Gatsby's parties starts the revelry: "Suddenly one of the gypsies, in trembling opal, seizes a cocktail out of the air, dumps it down for courage and, moving her hands like Frisco, dances out alone on the canvas platform." The Great Gatsby, chapter 3.
 The Marx Brothers referred to Frisco in an early version of their "Theatrical Agency" sketch in On the Balcony. The Frisco reference was replaced by Maurice Chevalier when they filmed the sequence in Monkey Business.

See also
 List of dancers

References
Notes

Further reading
Lowry, Ed;  Foy, Charlie; and  Levitt, Paul M. (1999) Joe Frisco: Comic, Jazz Dancer, and Railbird

External links 

 
 

Vaudeville performers
1889 births
1958 deaths
Actors from Davenport, Iowa
Deaths from cancer in California
People from Milan, Illinois
Male actors from Illinois
American male film actors
Burials at Hollywood Forever Cemetery
20th-century American male actors
Eccentric dancers